Clement Eaton (23 February 1898 in Winston-Salem, North Carolina – 12 August 1980) was an American historian who specialized in the American South.

He received his education from the University of North Carolina, where he was president of Phi Beta Kappa, and graduated in 1919. He also attended Harvard University. He was chair of the History Department at Lafayette College from 1931 to 1942 and then a faculty member of the University of Kentucky.

Selected writings
History of the Old South: The Emergence of a Reluctant Nation
A History of the Southern Confederacy
The Freedom-of-Thought Struggle in the Old South (1940)
The Growth of Southern Civilization, 1790-1860 (1961)
Mind of the Old South
Henry Clay and the Art of American Politics
The Waning of the Old South Civilization 1860-1880, Univ. of Geo press, 1969

References

Further reading

External links
 Inventory of the Clement Eaton Recollections, in the Southern Historical Collection, UNC-Chapel Hill

1898 births
1980 deaths
University of North Carolina at Chapel Hill alumni
Harvard University alumni
University of Kentucky faculty
20th-century American historians
American male non-fiction writers
Writers from Winston-Salem, North Carolina
Lafayette College faculty
20th-century American male writers